So Sweet Records is an independent record label, based out of Santa Monica, California. So Sweet Records has branches in the US, UK, and Japan.

So Sweet Records is owned by Tehmina Adaya, a Los Angeles-based entrepreneur, hotelier and music enthusiast. Vice President Paul Nugent manages A&R, while the label itself is managed by Yuki Hoang.  Adaya and Nugent partnered in 2005 to start the label.

Active roster
 Le Castle Vania
 Computer Club
 Foamo
 Eli Smith
 Frankmusik
 Sharkslayer
 Bird Peterson
 Digiraatii

Collaborations

Clothing
So me
MADSTEEZ
Kesh (Designer)
DEMONBABIES
GRNappletree

Previous releases
Shinichi Osawa
Dan Deacon

Remixes
Simian Mobile Disco
Kissy Sell Out
Felix Cartal

References

External links
 Myspace
 So Sweet Records Website
 So Sweet Records Twitter

American independent record labels